Old Town Residential Historic District is a historic district dating back to 1840.  It was listed on the National Register of Historic Places in 1983.

The district plus the previously NRHP-listed Distrito de las Escuelas comprises the majority of the historic residential architecture of West
Las Vegas, mostly adobe structures.  Las Vegas was established in 1835 as a land grant from the Mexican government to a group of twenty-nine families.

See also

National Register of Historic Places listings in San Miguel County, New Mexico

References

Las Vegas, New Mexico
Queen Anne architecture in New Mexico
Geography of San Miguel County, New Mexico
Historic districts on the National Register of Historic Places in New Mexico
National Register of Historic Places in San Miguel County, New Mexico